Eric Arthur Guy (18 August 1932 – 3 May 1991) was an Australian rules footballer who played with St Kilda in the VFL.

Family
The youngest of the nine children of Willie Guy (1886-1946), and Ruby May Guy (1889-1960), née Sawyer, Eric Arthur Guy was born on 18 August 1932.

His older brother, Wally Guy, played VFL football for the North Melbourne Football Club, and his nephew, Gary Guy played VFL football for the North Melbourne Football Club.

Football

Dromana (MPFL)
As a teenager, Guy played 26 games for the Dromana Football Club in the Mornington Peninsula Football League.

Carrum (MPFL)
He transferred to the Carrum Football Club, also in the MPFL.

Oakleigh (VFA)
He started his top level senior career at the Oakleigh Football Club in the Victorian Football Association in 1952. In a controversial start to his career at Oakleigh, both Guy and his Carrum teammate Bill Botten played the opening match of the 1952 season before their transfer paperwork had been formally lodged, which resulted in the match, which Oakleigh had won by ten goals, being forfeited to Brunswick.

Guy played 91 senior games for the club over five years.

St Kilda (VFL)
Guy did enough to catch the eye of St Kilda and they recruited him for the 1957 season. A tough and fearless half back flanker, he served as vice-captain at St Kilda for three of his six seasons, as well as representing Victoria in interstate football.

He led Longwarry to a premiership in 1968 in the West Gippsland FL. The side include a young schoolboy named Peter Knights who would become a  champion.

After retiring as a player he returned to St Kilda as an assistant to coach Allan Jeans. He stepped in to coach when Jeans was away on state duties in 1972 and later when jeans was ill in 1974. A total of six games for 3 wins.

Death
He died in Tynong, Victoria on 3 May 1991.

Footnotes

References
 Fiddian, Marc: Devils at Play. A History of the Oakleigh Football Club, Pakenham Gazette, Pakenham 1982.

External links
 
 Eric Guy's coaching record at AFL Tables
 
 Eric Guy, at Boyles Football Photos.
 Eric 'The Tank' Guy, at the VFA Project.

1932 births
Australian rules footballers from Victoria (Australia)
St Kilda Football Club players
St Kilda Football Club coaches
Oakleigh Football Club players
1991 deaths